Chuvashsky Kuganak (Sıwaş-Quğanaq) is a rural locality (a village) in Krasnoyarsky Selsoviet, Sterlitamaksky District, Bashkortostan, Russia. The population was 213 as of 2010. There are 4 streets.

Geography 
Chuvashsky Kuganak is located 23 km north of Sterlitamak (the district's administrative centre) by road. Cherkassy is the nearest rural locality.

References 

Rural localities in Sterlitamaksky District